The Ruger SP101 is a series of double-action revolvers produced by the American company Sturm, Ruger & Co. The SP101 is a small frame and all-steel-construction carry revolver, with a five-shot (.38 Special, .357 Magnum, and 9×19mm Parabellum), six-shot (.327 Federal Magnum and .32 H&R Magnum), or eight-shot (.22 LR) cylinder.

History
The Ruger SP101 was introduced in 1989 as the smaller-frame counterpart to the GP100. Both of these revolvers, together, replaced Sturm, Ruger & Co's long-standing staple in the American firearms market, the Ruger Security-Six series revolvers. A 9 mm version was available until its discontinuation around 1998, but was later re-released in early 2018. A basic .22 LR version was also available until 2003 while a redesigned version was introduced in 2011.

Features and description
The SP101 is currently manufactured in .327 Federal Magnum, .357 Magnum, 9 mm, .38 Special, and .22 LR.
Barrel lengths 2" (57.15mm), 3" (77.79mm), and 4" (106.7mm) with full underlugs. 4" (101.6 mm) and 4" (106.7mm) with half underlug.
Stainless steel construction
Transfer bar safety mechanism
Firing pin mounted in frame
The Transfer bar in the SP101 is connected directly to the trigger
Fixed (all calibers) or adjustable (.327 Federal Magnum, .357 Magnum and .22 LR) sights
Spurred or spurless (double-action only) hammer

Specifications
Weight:
2", 25 oz. (708 g)
3", 27 oz. (765 g)
4", 22 LR: 30 oz. (850 g), .327 Federal Magnum: 29.5 oz (836 g), and .357 Magnum: 29.5 oz.(836 g)
Barrel lengths: 2" (57.15 mm), 3" (77.79 mm), 4" (101.6 mm)
Double-action/single-action
Double action only on select models
Five-shot (.38 Special, .357 Magnum, 9×19mm Parabellum), six-shot (.327 Federal Magnum, .32 H&R Magnum), eight-shot (.22 LR)
Maximum effective range: 33 to 55 yards (30 to 50 meters) depending on barrel length and cartridge load

Models

All models are made of stainless steel
Caliber: .357 Magnum SP101s handle all .357 Magnum factory loads and accept factory .38 Special cartridges
Spurless-hammer models (double-action only) are designated by an "L" in their catalog numbers

Notes

References
Ruger's SP101 page
Ruger SP101 -- A Sturdy Rimfire "Secret" by Clair Rees, Guns

External links 

SP101
.327 Federal Magnum firearms
.38 Special firearms
.357 Magnum firearms
9mm Parabellum revolvers
.22 LR revolvers
Police weapons
Weapons and ammunition introduced in 1989